John Robert Fielding (born 7 April 1982) is an English former professional footballer who played as a defender in the Football League for York City, and in non-League football for Harrogate Town.

References

External links

1982 births
Living people
People from Billingham
Footballers from County Durham
English footballers
Association football defenders
York City F.C. players
Harrogate Town A.F.C. players
English Football League players